Graciela Esmilce Martínez Esquivel (born 24 May 2001) is a Paraguayan professional footballer who plays as a forward for Brazilian Série A1 club Real Ariquemes EC on loan from Associação Ferroviária de Esportes and for the Paraguay women's national team.

Club career
In April 2022, Martínez was loaned to Vasco da Gama until the end of the year.

References

External links

2001 births
Living people
People from San Lorenzo, Paraguay
Paraguayan women's footballers
Women's association football forwards
Cerro Porteño players
Associação Ferroviária de Esportes (women) players
Campeonato Brasileiro de Futebol Feminino Série A1 players
Paraguay women's international footballers
Paraguayan expatriate women's footballers
Paraguayan expatriate sportspeople in Brazil
Expatriate women's footballers in Brazil
21st-century Paraguayan women
CR Vasco da Gama (women) players